The Chigorin Memorial is a chess tournament played in honour of Mikhail Chigorin (1850–1908), founder of the Soviet Chess School and one of the leading players of his day. The first and most important edition was the one played in 1909 in St. Petersburg. Later on, an international invitation Memorial tournament series was established, and mainly played in the Black Sea resort Sochi (from 1963 to 1990). Further irregular tournaments had been held in 1947, 1951, 1961, and 1972, played in diverse venues. From 1993 the venue returned to his hometown. The Memorial is now played as an Open event.

St. Petersburg 1909

President of the organising committee was Peter Petrovich Saburov, President of the St. Petersburg Chess Club. Members of the committee were Boris Maliutin, O. Sossnitzky, V. Tschudowski, Sergius A. Znosko-Borovsky and Eugene A. Znosko-Borovsky. The main event lasted from 14 February to 12 March 1909.

{|class="wikitable" style="margin: 1em auto 1em auto; " align="left"
| align="center" style="background:#f0f0f0;"|N°
| align="center" style="background:#f0f0f0;"|Name
| align="center" style="background:#f0f0f0;"|1
| align="center" style="background:#f0f0f0;"|2
| align="center" style="background:#f0f0f0;"|3
| align="center" style="background:#f0f0f0;"|4
| align="center" style="background:#f0f0f0;"|5
| align="center" style="background:#f0f0f0;"|6
| align="center" style="background:#f0f0f0;"|7
| align="center" style="background:#f0f0f0;"|8
| align="center" style="background:#f0f0f0;"|9
| align="center" style="background:#f0f0f0;"|0
| align="center" style="background:#f0f0f0;"|1
| align="center" style="background:#f0f0f0;"|2
| align="center" style="background:#f0f0f0;"|3
| align="center" style="background:#f0f0f0;"|4
| align="center" style="background:#f0f0f0;"|5
| align="center" style="background:#f0f0f0;"|6
| align="center" style="background:#f0f0f0;"|7
| align="center" style="background:#f0f0f0;"|8
| align="center" style="background:#f0f0f0;"|9
| align="center" style="background:#f0f0f0;"|Total
|-
| 1||||*||1||1||1||½||½||½||1||1||1||½||1||0||1||½||1||1||1||1||14½
|-
| 2||||0||*||½||1||½||1||1||1||½||1||1||1||0||1||1||1||1||1||1||14½
|-
| 3||||0||½||*||1||0||1||1||½||1||½||½||½||1||0||½||1||½||½||1||11
|-
| 4||||0||0||0||*||0||1||½||0||½||1||0||1||1||1||1||1||1||1||1||11
|-
| 5||||½||½||1||1||*||0||1||0||1||1||1||1||½||0||0||0||½||½||1||10½
|-
| 6||||½||0||0||0||1||*||0||½||½||½||½||1||1||½||1||½||1||1||½||10
|-
| 7||||½||0||0||½||0||1||*||½||½||1||½||1||1||½||1||½||0||0||1||9½
|-
| 8||||0||0||½||1||1||½||½||*||0||0||1||½||½||0||½||½||½||1||1||9
|-
| 9||||0||½||0||½||0||½||½||1||*||1||0||0||1||1||½||0||1||½||1||9
|-
| 10||||0||0||½||0||0||½||0||1||0||*||½||1||1||1||½||0||1||1||1||9
|-
| 11||||½||0||½||1||0||½||½||0||1||½||*||0||0||0||½||1||1||1||½||8½
|-
| 12||||0||0||½||0||0||0||0||½||1||0||1||*||½||1||1||1||0||1||1||8½
|-
| 13||||1||1||0||0||½||0||0||½||0||0||1||½||*||½||½||½||1||0||1||8
|-
| 14||||0||0||1||0||1||½||½||1||0||0||1||0||½||*||½||½||½||0||½||7½
|-
| 15||||½||0||½||0||1||0||0||½||½||½||½||0||½||½||*||1||½||½||0||7
|-
| 16||||0||0||0||0||1||½||½||½||1||1||0||0||½||½||0||*||½||1||0||7
|-
| 17||||0||0||½||0||½||0||1||½||0||0||0||1||0||½||½||½||*||½||½||6
|-
| 18||||0||0||½||0||½||0||1||0||½||0||0||0||1||1||½||0||½||*||0||5½
|-
| 19||||0||0||0||0||0||½||0||0||0||0||½||0||0||½||1||1||½||1||*||5
|-
|}

Rubinstein and Lasker won 875 rubles (each), Spielmann and Duras 475 rubles (each), Bernstein 190 rubles, Teichmann 120 rubles, Perlis 80 rubles, Cohn, Schlechter, and Salwe 40 rubles (each).

1947-1972 
From 1947, there were several Chigorin memorial tournaments, but it was not until 1963 that it was established as an annual event in Sochi. These tournaments were all played on the round robin format.

{| class="wikitable"
! Year !! Winner !! City
|-
| 1947 || Mikhail Botvinnik ||Moscow
|-
| 1951 || Vasily Smyslov || Leningrad
|-
| 1961 || Mark Taimanov || Rostov-on-Don
|-
| 1972 || Lev Polugaevsky || Kislovodsk
|}

Sochi period (1963-1990) 

{| class="wikitable"
! # !! Year !! Winner !! City
|-
| 1 || 1963 || Lev Polugaevsky || Sochi
|-
| 2 || 1964 || Nikolai Krogius ||  Sochi
|-
| 3 || 1965 || Wolfgang Unzicker  Boris Spassky || Sochi
|-
| 4 || 1966 || Viktor Korchnoi || Sochi
|-
| 5 || 1967 || Alexander Zaitsev  Vladimir Simagin  Nikolai Krogius  Leonid Shamkovich  Boris Spassky || Sochi
|-
| 6 || 1973 || Mikhail Tal || Sochi
|-
| 7 || 1974 || Lev Polugaevsky || Sochi
|-
| 8 || 1976 || Lev Polugaevsky  Evgeny Sveshnikov  || Sochi
|-
| 9 || 1977 || Mikhail Tal || Sochi
|-
| 10 || 1979 || Nukhim Rashkovsky || Sochi
|-
| 11 || 1980 || Alexander Panchenko || Sochi
|-
| 12 || 1981 || Vitaly Tseshkovsky || Sochi
|-
| 13 || 1982 || Mikhail Tal || Sochi
|-
| 14 || 1983 || Anatoly Vaisser  Evgeny Sveshnikov || Sochi
|-
| 15 || 1984 || Georgy Agzamov || Sochi
|-
| 16 || 1985 || Evgeny Sveshnikov || Sochi
|-
| 17 || 1986 || Svetozar Gligorić  Alexander Beliavsky  Rafael Vaganian || Sochi
|-
| 18 || 1987 || Sergey Smagin  Evgeny Pigusov  Andrei Kharitonov || Sochi
|-
| 19 || 1988 || Sergey Dolmatov || Sochi
|-
| 20 || 1989 || Alexey Vyzmanavin || Sochi
|-
| 21 || 1990 || Vadim Ruban || Sochi
|}

Back to St. Petersburg (1993-present) 
Since 1993, the Chigorin Memorial has been played as an open Swiss system tournament. The 13th edition was not played for superstitious reasons. The winners are listed below.

{| class="sortable wikitable"
! # !! Year !! Winner
|-
|1 ||	1993|| Alexey Dreev
|-
|2 ||	1994|| Ildar Ibragimov	
|-
|3 ||	1995||	Vladimir Burmakin
|-
|4 ||	1996||	Alexei Fedorov  Lembit Oll
|-
|5 ||	1997||	Konstantin Sakaev
|-
|6 ||	1998||	Sergey Volkov
|-
|7 ||	1999||	Alexander Grischuk  Sergey Volkov
|-
|8 ||	2000||	Valerij Filippov	
|-
|9 ||	2001||	Mikhail Kobalia	
|-
|10 ||	2002||	Alexander Fominyh
|-
|11 ||	2004||	Sergey Ivanov
|-
|12 ||	2005||	Igor Zakharevich  Roman Ovetchkin
|-
|14 ||	2006||	Dmitry Bocharov	
|-
|15 ||	2007||	Sergei Movsesian
|-
|16 ||  2008||  Vladimir Belov
|- 
|17 ||  2009||  Sergey Volkov
|-
|18 ||  2010||  Eltaj Safarli
|-
|19 ||  2011||  Dmitry Bocharov
|- 
|20 ||  2012||  Alexander Areshchenko
|-
|21 ||  2013||  Pavel Eljanov
|-
|22 ||  2014||  Ivan Ivanisevic
|-
|23 ||  2015||  Kirill Alekseenko
|-
|24 ||  2016||  Kirill Alekseenko
|-
|25 ||  2017|| Kirill Alekseenko
|-
|26 || 2018|| Pouya Idani
|-
|27 || 2019|| Vitaly Sivuk
|}

References

 The International Chess Congress: St. Petersburg 1909, New York, edition Lasker Press, 1910 (reprinted by Dover books 1971)

External links
St. Petersburg 1909 and 1914
The Independent, 1999, Jon Speelman: Results 1993-1999
Results from The Week in Chess: TWIC 157 (1997), TWIC 212 (1998), TWIC 262 (1999), TWIC 314 (2000), TWIC 365 (2001), TWIC 418 (2002), TWIC 572 (2005), TWIC 625 (2006), TWIC 683 (2007), TWIC 730 (2008), 2009, 2011
Results from ChessBase: 2006 edition, 2010 edition
Results from Ruschess: 2004 edition
Results from Rusbase: Editions 1961-1990
Results from Chess-Results: 2012, 2013, 2014, 2015

Chess competitions
Chess in Russia
1909 in chess
Chess memorial tournaments
1909 in the Russian Empire